On Stage Everybody is a 1945 film starring Jack Oakie, Peggy Ryan, and Johnny Coy. Also appearing are Otto Kruger, Esther Dale, Milburn Stone, Wallace Ford, Julie London, and The King Sisters, who sang "Stuff Like That There", written by Jay Livingston and Ray Evans.

Plot

Cast
 Ilene Woods as Talent Show Winner

References

External links
On Stage Everybody at IMDb
On Stage Everybody at TCMDB

1945 films
Universal Pictures films
1945 musical films
American musical films
American black-and-white films
Films directed by Jean Yarbrough
1940s American films